Vom Ca-nhum (born 1965) is a football manager and former player who is the head coach of the Chinese Taipei national team.

Early life
Vom was born to a Taiwanese father and East Timorese mother.

Career
In 2019, Vom was appointed manager of Shanxi Metropolis, becoming the first Taiwanese manager to coach a Chinese team.

In February 2020, Vom was appointed as Chinese Taipei head coach, having been one of only a small number of coaches on the island with an AFC Pro A coaching license.
He was sacked in October 2021, due to mismanagement of the team.

In July 2020, Vom succeeded Toshiaki Imai as manager of Taiwan Football Premier League team Taichung Futuro.

Managerial statistics

References 

1965 births
Living people
Taiwanese footballers
East Timorese football managers
Taiwanese football managers
Association footballers not categorized by position
Taiwanese people of East Timorese descent
Shanxi Metropolis F.C. managers
Football managers in China
Chinese Taipei national football team managers